is a Japanese suit actress. She is married to the suit actor, Hirofumi Fukuzawa.

Partial filmography
 Denji Sentai Megaranger as Mega Pink
 Tetsuwan Tantei Robotack as Robotack
 Mirai Sentai Timeranger as TimePink, Sion (stunt double), TimeGreen
 Hyakujuu Sentai Gaoranger as GaoWhite, Copywhite
 Ninpuu Sentai Hurricaneger as Furabijinu
 Tokusou Sentai Dekaranger as Deka Pink
 Godzilla: Final Wars as Minilla, Rodan
 Mahou Sentai Magiranger as Snowgel, Smoky
 GoGo Sentai Boukenger as Bouken Pink (Sub)
 Juken Sentai Gekiranger as Xia Fu
 Kamen Rider Kiva as Basshaa
 Engine Sentai Go-onger vs. Gekiranger as Geki Yellow
 Samurai Sentai Shinkenger as Shinken Pink (Sub)
 Samurai Sentai Shinkenger vs. Go-onger: GinmakuBang!! as Shinken Pink, Go-on Yellow
 Tensou Sentai Goseiger as Datas, Gosei Pink (Sub)
 Tensou Sentai Goseiger: Epic on the Movie as Datas
 Tensou Sentai Goseiger vs. Shinkenger: Epic on Ginmaku as Datas
 Kaizoku Sentai Gokaiger vs. Space Sheriff Gavan: The Movie as Gokai Pink
 Kamen Rider × Super Sentai: Super Hero Taisen as Gokai Pink
 Zyuden Sentai Kyoryuger as Luckyuro
 Ressha Sentai Toqger as Miss Gritta

Partial other works
 Rittai Ninja Katsugeki Tenchu: Stealth Assassins as motion capture performer for Ayame as shown in the credits.

References

1967 births
Japanese film actresses
Living people
Actors from Shizuoka Prefecture